No. 11 Squadron RCAF was a Royal Canadian Air Force squadron that was active during the Second World War. It was primarily used in an anti-submarine role and was based on the east coast of Canada and Newfoundland. It was initially formed at RCAF Station Ottawa before moving to Dartmouth, Nova Scotia on 3 November 1939, where it became operational. From 26 October 1943 to 17 June 1944, it operated from Torbay, Newfoundland before returning to Halifax for a year, before again moving, across the country to Patricia Bay, British Columbia on 31 May 1945. The squadron flew the Lockheed Hudson and Consolidated Liberator maritime patrol bombers before disbanding on 15 September.
The unit's first operational flight, on 10 November 1939, was to provide sighting practice for the anti-aircraft guns of the Royal Navy battlecruiser  and aircraft carrier , as well as for the Halifax, Nova Scotia shore batteries.

References

Citations

Bibliography

Royal Canadian Air Force squadrons (disbanded)